Atalaya calcicola is a species of trees native to Northern and Eastern Queensland.

A small tree, up to 10 metres tall, it is usually found growing in dry rainforests on limestone. The species produces characteristic. The leaves are pinnate, usually with only two leaflets. The leaflet bases are very uneven.

References

calcicola
Flora of Queensland
Taxa named by Sally T. Reynolds